The Bangladesh Baptist Church Sangha is a Baptist Christian denomination in Bangladesh. It is affiliated with the Baptist World Alliance. The headquarters is in Dhaka.

History
The Bangladesh Baptist Church Sangha has its origins in a British mission of the BMS World Mission in 1793.  It is officially founded in 1935 as Bengal Baptist Union.  In 2001, it takes the name of Bangladesh Baptist Church Sangha. According to a denomination census released in 2020, it claimed 381 churches and 25,187 members.

Contributions 
One of the major contributions by the early Baptists missionaries to the development of modern Bengal in the area of linguistics and educational work. This included the development of a Bengali dictionary and grammar, the first translation of the Bible in Bengali as well as the publication Digdarshan and Samachar Darpan, periodicals that represent the beginnings of the Bengali press. They also co-founded the Calcutta School Book Society in 1817 which published thousands of textbooks in modern science, geography and history for the first time in Bengali.

Ministries 

The BBS participates as a partner with the College of Christian Theology in Dhaka and also operates hostel programs for students at college and university level. The BBS runs 2 high schools for girls and boys, a junior high school, 64 primary schools, a school for blind girls, two children's homes with schools as well as a hospital, a leprosy hospital, and 4 clinics.

Affiliations 

The BBS participates actively in ecumenical relationships through:

 National Council of Churches – Bangladesh
 Christian Conference of Asia
 World Council of Churches
 Baptist World Alliance
 Asia Pacific Baptist Federation

See also 
 Bible
 Born again
 Worship service (evangelicalism)
 Jesus Christ
 Believers' Church

References

External links
 Official Website

Baptist Christianity in Bangladesh
Christian organizations established in 1913
Baptist denominations in Asia
Baptist denominations established in the 20th century
1913 establishments in India
Evangelicalism in Bangladesh